Giedrė Voverienė (born 5 February 1968 in Vilnius) is a Lithuanian orienteering competitor. She received a bronze medal in relay at the 2002 European Orienteering Championships in Sümeg, together with Vilma Rudzenskaitė and Ieva Sargautytė. The same team finished 4th at the 2003 World Orienteering Championships in Rapperswil-Jona.

Voveriene finished 5th in the short distance at the 2000 European championships in Truskavets.

References

External links
 

1968 births
Living people
Sportspeople from Vilnius
Lithuanian orienteers
Female orienteers
Foot orienteers
World Games medalists in orienteering
World Games silver medalists
Competitors at the 2001 World Games